Reaver or Reavers may refer to:

Fictional characters
 Reavers (comics), cyborgs in Marvel Comics
 Reaver (Firefly), in the 2002 TV series, and the related movie Serenity
 villains in the 2017 film Logan
 monster hunters in the 2019 TV series The Witcher
 an enemy in The Runelords book series by David Farland
 a pirate lord in the video games Fable II (2008) and Fable III (2010)
 a class specialization in the video game Dark Age of Camelot
 a class specialization in the video game Dragon Age: Inquisition
 a unit in the video game StarCraft

Other uses
The Reavers, a 2007 comic novel by George MacDonald Fraser
Reaver, a tool used to exploit a vulnerability in Wi-Fi Protected Setup (2012)
Reaver, an associate of the Reaver Mercenary Company in the mod DiscoveryGC of Freelancer (2003)

See also

The Reivers (disambiguation)
Border reivers (disambiguation)